Global Underground 033: Layo & Bushwacka!, Rio is a DJ mix album in the Global Underground series, compiled and mixed by English electronicDJ and producer duo Layo & Bushwacka!. This set is based on a performance in Rio de Janeiro.

Track listing

Disc one
 Ellis D - "Took My Love Away"
 The Daou - "Surrender Yourself (Danny Tenaglia Ballroom Mix)"
 Marshall Jefferson - "Open Our Eyes"
 L.B. Bad - "Touch Me! Touch Me!!"
 Kym Mazelle - "Taste My Love"
 N.Y. House'n Authority - "APT. 1A"
 Blunted Dummies - "House for All"
 DA Rebels - "House Nation Under a Grove"
 Sheila - "Acid Kiss"
 Lil Louis & The World – "I Called U (Why'd U Fall)"
 Liaisons D – "Future FJP"
 Master C & J feat. Liz Torres - "Can’t Get Enough"
 Pierres Pfantasy Club – "Dream Girl"
 François K - "Hypnodelic"
 Eddie Flashin Fowlkes - "Move Me"
 Sine - "I Like It Deep (Soozee Kreemcheeze Mix)"
 Jaya – "One Kiss"
 KC Flight - "Planet E (House Mix)"
 Fingers Inc. – "Never No More Lonely"
 Metro Area - "Proton Candy"
 Fallout - "The Morning After"
 How II House – "Time to Feel the Rhythm"
 Cajmere feat. Dajae – "Brighter Days"
 Kenny Larkin – "We Shall Overcome (Richie Rich Hawtin Remix)"
 Soul Boy – "Harmonica Track"
 UBQ Project feat. Kathy Summers – "When I Fell N Love"

Disc two
 Phonique - "Bang"
 Hug – "Fluteorgie"
 Tiga - "3 Weeks (Troy Pierce's Move Until You Leave Mix)"
 Pier Bucci - "Hay Consuelo (Samim Remix)"
 Guy Gerber - "Belly Dancing"
 Stefan Goldmann - "Aurora"
 Paul Ritch - "Samba"
 Richie Hawtin - "Spastik"
 Adam Beyer - "A Walking Contradiction"
 Bushwacka! - "Long Distance"
 Jesus Loves You – After the Love/Layo & Bushwacka! - "Ashes Remain"
 Henrik Schwarz - "Walk Music"
 Patrick Chardronnet - "Ledge"
 Layo & Bushwacka! - "Tabloid"
 Martin Buttrich – "What’s Your Name?"
 Larry Heard Presents Mr. White - "The Sun Can’t Compare (Long Version)"
 Riley Reinhold - "Lights in My Eyes"
 Layo & Bushwacka! – "Saudade (Remix)"

References

External links 

Global Underground
2007 compilation albums